Alagoda is a village in Sri Lanka. It is located near Palipana, on the road to Alawatugoda, within Kandy District, Central Province.

History
In Archibald Campbell Lawrie's 1896 gazetteer of the province, he writes that the people of the area of Alagoda and Madadeniya are not of good character.

Demographics

See also
List of towns in Central Province, Sri Lanka

External links

References

Populated places in Kandy District